Lathanga is a village in the state of Odisha, India with its postal Zip code 754140. Lathanga is the corrupt form of the Sanskrit word 'Rathaanga' which means 'like the body of a chariot'. This village has become very much known among the people due to its contribution to the triple Ss i.e. Sekhareswar, [Sanskrit

Location
Lathanga is near to Paradip and 10 kilometers distant from the Bay of Bengal.

Demographics
According to 2001 Census, Male Population of the village is 186, Female Population is 198 and  Total Population is 384. In this village, Male Literates are  155, Female Literates are 137 and Total Literates are 292. The rate of literacy is 76%. 05 Male Marginal Agricultural Laborers and 04 Female Marginal Agricultural Laborers are residing in this Village.

Socio-Cultural and Literary Background

This is the native place of Sanskrit poet and lyricist Manmohan Acharya. Sri Jagannath Behera, the alumni of Sekhareswar Sanskrit Tol of this village has been awarded with National Sangeeta Nataka Academy Award.
Nobel Laurate, Rabindra Nath Tagore visited this village during his stay in nearby village, Pandua. Now a public road connecting Pandua to Lathang is named as Rabindra Sarani.

Social Service and Consumer Movement
Dr. Loknath Acharya, Former Director Health Services & Member AGCM Odisha, Son of the village has traveled many countries and contributed a lot to contemporary studies and research of Medical Science.
This famous village added a new feather to the cap of Consumer Movement in India through the effective movement of Anchalika Khauti Surakshaa Sangha and its Founder President Sri Bansidhar Acharya. The Social Organisations working in this Village are Sekhareswar Yuva Parishad, Sri Gopinath Jew Anchalika Paalaa Parishad, Anchalika Khaauti Surakshaa Sangha, Maa Charitable Trust, Vaaruni Utsava Samiti, Sri Gopinaath Viparyaya Prasamana Samitee and Budhi Kendulaai Mahilaa Samiti.

Sekhareswar Temple
Sekhareswar Temple is situated in the village Lathanga in Jagatsinghpur district in the state of Odisha. Sekhareswar means the Godhead. Here in the Temple Lord Shiva has been worshiped since the time immemorial.

Sanskrit Studies
The Formal Sanskrit study was launched from this village Sanskrit Paathasaalaa (Sanskrit Kindergarten) during 17th Century and spread over the geographical territory of hole Jagatsinghpur district, a Sub-division at that period. Sekhareswar Sanskrit Vidyalaya has been officially established in 1926 by Late Mahaamahopaadhyaaya Pandit Gunanidhi Acharya. Sekhareswar Sanskrit College was founded in 1993. This Small village produced about 5000 Sanskrit teachers and Pandits to serve the Society by teaching Sanskrit and Culture. Presently about 100 teachers from this village are engaged in Sanskrit studies and research. Pdt. Surendranath Acharya and Dr.Rabindra Nath Acharya are the eminent Sanskrit Activists of the State of Odisha.The famous Sanskrit Poet, Pandit Sudarshan Acharya was born in this Village.

Spirituality

Temples in the Village are Sri Sekhareswar Temple, Sri Gopinath Jew Temple, Sri Ramhanuman Temple (under construction), Sri Mahaveer Temple, Sri Sri Budhi Samantaani Graamadevataa and Maa Saradaa Temple(under construction). Spiritual centers in the village are Thaakur Anukulchandra Satsangh Kendra, Sri Raadhaaballabha Vaishnava Math, Sri Sri Abhiraamaparamahamsa Gosthi and Thakur Mahimaa Alekh Bhakta Samitee. The Odisha Famous Vaaruni Yaatraa, Chandana Yaatraa and Sri Sri Satya Naaraayana Vaadipaalaa are the ceremonies those add the cultural glories of Odisha.

References

Villages in Jagatsinghpur district